Starjob is an EP by The Frogs that was recorded in 1994, and finally released in 1997. Billy Corgan produced the record under the alias "Johnny Goat", and Jimmy Chamberlin played bongos on the song "Raped".

The songs on Starjob deal with celebrity and fame, although the songs "Raped" and "Weird on the Avenue" continue the perverse themes of previous albums. "I Only Play 4 Money" may be the most well known song by the band, which contains the lyrics "I don't give a fuck about the fans" and "if you send me fanmail/I won't write back". "Lord Grunge" is an homage to Kurt Cobain, and references The Who, Black Sabbath, Black Flag and the Beatles as the forefathers of grunge.

This release is considerably better-produced than most of the Frogs' previous material, which can sound like home recordings.

Track listing
 "Lord Grunge" – 2:30
 "Raped" – 1:38
 "Weird on the Avenue" – 2:13
 "Starboy" – 2:42
 "I Only Play 4 Money" – 4:33
 "Stargirl" – 2:20

Personnel
 Jimmy Flemion - Guitars, bass, lead vocals
 Dennis Flemion - Drums, keyboards, backing vocals
 Billy Corgan - Additional guitar, bass, backing vocals
 Jimmy Chamberlin - Additional percussion

See also
1991: The Year Punk Broke
Seattle Sound

References

1997 EPs
The Frogs (band) albums
The Smashing Pumpkins
Albums produced by Billy Corgan